"The Chaos" is a poem demonstrating the irregularity of English spelling and pronunciation. Written by Dutch writer, traveller, and teacher Gerard Nolst Trenité (1870–1946) under the pseudonym of Charivarius, it includes about 800 examples of irregular spelling. The first version of 146 lines of text appeared in an appendix to the author's 1920 textbook Drop Your Foreign Accent: engelsche uitspraakoefeningen, but "the most complete and authoritative version ever likely to emerge", published by the Spelling Society in 1993–94, has 274 lines.

To demonstrate the theme of the poem, the opening lines are:
Dearest creature in Creation,
Studying English pronunciation,
and the closing lines are:
Hiccough has the sound of "cup"......
My advice is—give it up!
These lines are set out as in the author's version, with alternate couplets indented and the problematic words italicised.

Partial text 
Dearest creature in Creation,
Studying English pronunciation,

It will keep you, Susy, busy,
Make your head with heat grow dizzy;

Pray, console your loving poet,
Make my coat look new, dear, sew it?

Sword and sward, retain and Britain,
(Mind the latter, how it's written!)

Now I surely will not plague you
With such words as vague and ague,

Previous, precious; fuchsia, via;
Pipe, snipe, recipe and choir,

Hear me say devoid of trickery,
daughter, laughter, and Terpsichore,

(continued)

Dedication 
A mimeographed version of the poem in Harry Cohen's possession is dedicated to "Miss Susanne Delacruix, Paris", who is thought to have been one of Nolst Trenité's students. The author addressed her as "dearest creature in creation" in the first line, and later as "Susy" in line 5.

See also

 
 Ghoti
 "Lion-Eating Poet in the Stone Den"
 Orthography
 English orthography
 English spelling-to-sound correspondences
 Spelling reform
 List of reforms of the English language

References

External links

 The Classic Concordance of Cacographic Chaos, Introduced by Chris Upward Text of 274-line version of the poem, with introduction, at The Spelling Society website
 Chaos Challenge project. Interactive application with IPA transcription popping up along with professional narration
 Text with IPA transcription of first 15 verses in British and American English, by David Madore
 Audio-visual of shortened version of "The Chaos": Reading in Canadian accent, with scrolling transcript
 The Chaos at LibriVox - links to several readings
 Concordant Chaos annotated version at the Longest Now, connecting the Spelling Society version with other versions Trenité published over his lifetime.
 Drop Your Foreign Accent (1932)

English orthography
English-language education
Humorous poems
Phonetics